Killer Elite may refer to:

Films
 The Killer Elite (1975), with James Caan and Robert Duvall
 Killer Elite (film) (2011), with Robert De Niro, Jason Statham and Clive Owen

Music
 Killer Elite (album) (1985), by British band Avenger